The Armenia national under-19 football team is the youth football team of Armenia. The team is based mostly on the young players from the league and competes every years in order to qualify for the European Under-19 Football Championship. The team played its first match in 1993, Armenia having until 1992 been part of the USSR.

History
Armenia U-19 team made its debut in a European competition in 2005. It finished in the fourth place in its group, and therefore did not qualify for the semifinals.

UEFA European Under-19 Championship

Managers 
Sargis Hovsepyan –  – November 25, 2014
Marc Leliévre – November 26, 2014 – December 7, 2015
Aram Voskanyan – 2016

Recent results

2021

Current squad 
 The following players were called up for the 2023 UEFA European Under-19 Championship qualification matches.
 Match dates: 21, 24 and 27 September 2022
 Caps and goals correct as of:''' 21 September 2022, after the match against

Recent call-ups 
The following players were called up within the last twelve months and remain ineligible.

References

External links
 U-19 section at FFA
 Uefa Under-19 website Contains fixtures and results

European national under-19 association football teams
Youth football in Armenia
Armenia national youth football team